The 2006–07 UNLV Runnin' Rebels basketball team represented the University of Nevada, Las Vegas. The team was coached by Lon Kruger, returning for his third year with the Runnin' Rebels. They played their home games at the Thomas & Mack Center on UNLV's main campus in Paradise, Nevada and were a member of the Mountain West Conference. The Runnin' Rebels finished the season 30–7, 12–4 in MWC play. They won the 2007 Mountain West Conference men's basketball tournament to receive an automatic bid to the 2007 NCAA Division I men's basketball tournament, earning a 7 seed in the Midwest Region. The Runnin' Rebels defeated 10 seed Georgia Tech in the opening round and 2 seed Wisconsin to reach the Sweet Sixteen before losing to 3 seed Oregon in the regional semifinals.

Roster

Schedule and results 

|-
!colspan=9 style=| Exhibition

|-
!colspan=9 style=| Non-conference regular season

|-
!colspan=9 style=| MWC regular season

|-
!colspan=9 style=| MWC tournament

|-
!colspan=9 style=| NCAA tournament

Rankings

References 

UNLV Runnin' Rebels basketball seasons
UNLV
UNLV
UNLV Runnin' Rebels basketball team
UNLV Runnin' Rebels basketball team